This is a list of the wool, cotton and other textile mills in the City of Bradford, a metropolitan borough in West Yorkshire, England.  This includes Bradford and Keighley with Baildon, Bingley,  Denholme, Ilkley, Queensbury and Shelf, Silsden and Shipley.

The list also includes mills in Skipton, historically also in the West Riding of Yorkshire but now in North Yorkshire.

Allerton (Bradford)

Baildon

Bingley

Bolton (Bradford)

Bowling (Bradford)

Bradford

Burley-In—Wharfedale (Ilkley)

Haworth (Bingley; Keighley)

Heaton (Bradford)

Horton (Bradford)

Keighley

Manningham (Bradford)

Morton (Keighley)

Shipley with Saltaire

Skipton

Thornton (Denholme; Thornton)

Wilsden (Bingley)

See also
 Heavy Woollen District
 Textile processing

References

Footnotes

The National Monument Record is a legacy numbering system maintained
by English Heritage. Further details on each mill may be obtained from this url. http://yorkshire.u08.eu/

Notes

Bibliography

External links

 01
Bradford
Bradford (metropolitan borough)
Buildings and structures in the City of Bradford
Bradford
History of the textile industry
Industrial Revolution in England